This article contains information, results and statistics regarding the Australian national cricket team in the 2008 season. Statisticians class the 2008 season as matches played on tours that started between May 2008 and August 2008.

Player contracts
The 2008–09 list was announced on 9 April 2008. Note that uncontracted players still are available for selection for the national cricket team.

Match summary

M = Matches Played, W = Won, L = Lost, D = Drawn, T = Tied, NR = No Result

Series Summary

 Australia retained the Frank Worrell Trophy against the West Indies 2–0
 Australia won the ODI series against the West Indies 5–0
 Australia won the ODI series against Bangladesh 3–0

Tour of West Indies

Australia's tour of the West Indies commenced on 16 May with a tour match against a Jamaica Select XI in Trelawny and will conclude on 6 July with a One Day International in Basseterre.

Tour matches

Tour Match: 16–18 May, Trelawny

Tour Match: 21 June, Bridgetown

Test series

First Test: 22–26 May, Kingston

Australian XI: Phil Jaques, Simon Katich, Ricky Ponting (c), Michael Hussey, Brad Hodge, Andrew Symonds, Brad Haddin (wk), Brett Lee, Mitchell Johnson, Stuart Clark, Stuart MacGill

Test debut: Brad Haddin

Second Test: 30 May-3 June, North Sound

Australian XI: Phil Jaques, Simon Katich, Ricky Ponting (c), Michael Hussey, Michael Clarke, Andrew Symonds, Brad Haddin (wk), Brett Lee, Mitchell Johnson, Stuart Clark, Stuart MacGill

Third Test: 12–16 June, Bridgetown

Australian XI: Phil Jaques, Simon Katich, Ricky Ponting (c), Michael Hussey, Michael Clarke, Andrew Symonds, Brad Haddin (wk), Beau Casson, Brett Lee, Mitchell Johnson, Stuart Clark

Test debut: Beau Casson

Man of the Series: Shivnarine Chanderpaul

Twenty20 International

Only Twenty20 International: 20 June, Bridgetown

Twenty20 International debuts: Shaun Marsh, Luke Ronchi

One Day International series

First ODI: 24 June, Kingstown

One Day International debut: Shaun Marsh

Second ODI: 27 June, St George's

One Day International debut: Luke Ronchi

Third ODI: 29 June, St George's

Fourth ODI: 4 July, Basseterre

One Day International debut: David Hussey

Fifth ODI: 6 July, Basseterre

Man of the Series: Shane Watson

Bangladesh in Australia

Bangladesh will travel to Australia for a 3 match One Day International series at the end of August.

Practice matches

Practice match: 28 August, Darwin

One Day International series

First ODI: 30 August, Darwin

One Day International debut: Brett Geeves

Second ODI: 3 September, Darwin

Third ODI: 6 September, Darwin

 Man of the Series:  Michael Hussey

Statistics

Matches Played

The following is a table of statistics charting appearances by Australian cricketers in the 2008 season. The minimum requirement for inclusion is one match played. The players will be arranged in alphabetical order.

Source: cricinfo.com

Batting

Twenty20 Internationals

The following is a table of statistics charting Australian batsmen in Twenty20 International cricket in the 2007–08 season. The minimum requirement for inclusion is one innings played. The players will be arranged by most runs scored.

One Day Internationals

The following is a table of statistics charting Australian batsmen in One Day International cricket in the 2007–08 season. The minimum requirement for inclusion is one innings played. The players will be arranged by most runs scored.

Tests

The following is a table of statistics charting Australian batsmen in Test cricket in the 2008 season. The minimum requirement for inclusion is one innings played. The players will be arranged by most runs scored.

 Mts = Matches, Inns = Innings, NO = Not Outs, BF = Balls Faced, Avg = Batting Average, S/R = Batting Strike Rate, HS = Highest Score
Source: cricinfo.com

Bowling

Twenty20 Internationals

The following is a table of statistics charting Australian bowlers in Twenty20 International cricket in the 2008 season. The minimum requirement for inclusion is one ball bowled. The players will be arranged by most wickets taken.

One Day Internationals

The following is a table of statistics charting Australian bowlers in One Day International cricket in the 2008 season. The minimum requirement for inclusion is one ball bowled. The players will be arranged by most wickets taken.

Tests

The following is a table of statistics charting Australian bowlers in Test cricket in the 2008 season. The minimum requirement for inclusion is one ball bowled. The players will be arranged by most wickets taken.

Mts = Matches, Wkts = Wickets, Runs = Runs scored off bowler, Avg = Bowling Average, S/R = Bowling Strike Rate, BBI = Best Bowling Innings, Econ = Economy Rate, BBM = Best Bowling Match, Ovrs = Overs Bowled, 5WI = 5 Wickets Innings, 10WM = 10 Wickets Match 
Source: cricinfo.com

Catches

The following is a table of statistics charting catches taken by Australian fieldsmen in the 2008 season. The minimum requirement for inclusion is one catch. The players will be arranged in alphabetical order.

† Wicketkeeper
Source: cricinfo.com

Important events

 On 22 May wicketkeeper Brad Haddin became the 400th man to represent Australia in Test match cricket.
 On 30 May Australian captain Ricky Ponting became the seventh man to reach 10,000 Test match runs.
 On 1 June leg-spinner Stuart MacGill announced his retirement from international cricket effective at the end of the Second Test in Antigua, ending his ten-year international career.
 On 27 June Australian captain Ricky Ponting became the second Australian to reach 300 One Day Internationals.
 On 29 June fast bowler Brett Lee reached 300 One Day International wickets, dismissing Darren Sammy caught and bowled. This made him the fastest to 300 wickets in One Day International history.
 All-rounder Andrew Symonds was axed from Australia's squad to play Bangladesh after missing a team meeting to go fishing.

See also
Australia national cricket team
International cricket in 2008

References

Australia in international cricket
2008–09 Australian cricket season
2007–08 Australian cricket season